Haarlem is the capital city of North Holland, a province in the Netherlands.

Other places with the name Haarlem include:
Haarlem, Western Cape, a town in South Africa
Haarlem, a place in Suriname
Haarlemmermeer, a polder in North Holland

See also
Harlem (disambiguation)